L'Osier is a Michelin Guide 3-star classic French cuisine restaurant in Chuo-ku, Tokyo. It is located on the second floor of its own two-story building in Ginza.

The chef de cuisine is Olivier Chaignon. The restaurant first received its three Michelin stars under chef Bruno Menard.

References

French cuisine
Restaurants in Tokyo
Michelin Guide starred restaurants in Japan